HMS Weston was a Shoreham-class sloop of the British Royal Navy. Weston was built at Devonport Dockyard in 1931–1933.

Weston served on the Africa Station and in the Red Sea in the 1930s. In the Second World War, she was used for convoy escort duties, operating in British waters and in the North Atlantic, sinking the German submarine  in 1940, and later in West African waters. The ship was laid up in reserve after the end of the war in Europe and was scrapped in 1947.

Construction and design
The British Admiralty ordered four sloops as part of the 1930 construction programme, with three ordered from Devonport and one from Chatham dockyard. They were intended for a dual role of patrol service in overseas stations in peacetime and minesweeping during war.

Two Admiralty 3-drum water-tube boilers fed two geared steam turbines which drove two propeller shafts.

The ship's main gun armament consisted of two 4-inch (102 mm) QF Mk V guns mounted fore-and-aft on the ship's centreline, with the forward gun on a High-Angle (HA) anti-aircraft mounting and the aft gun on a Low-Angle (LA) mounting, suitable only for use against surface targets. Four 3-pounder saluting guns completed the ship's gun armament. The initial anti-submarine armament consisted of four depth charges. The ship had a crew of 100 officers and other ranks.

Weston was  laid down at Devonport Dockyard on 7 September 1931. She was launched on 23 July 1932 and completed on 23 February 1933, with the pennant number L72.

Modifications
The repeat Shorehams were modified in 1937 to 1939 to improve their anti-aircraft capability, with Weston having a major refit in 1939, with the aft 4-inch gun being replaced by a second HA gun, and a quadruple Vickers .50 machine gun mount added for close-in anti-aircraft duties. In September 1939, a second quadruple machine gun mount was added. The ship's armament continued to be modified through the war, with the 3-pounder guns and the multiple machine guns removed, and first two, and later another two single Oerlikon 20 mm autocannon added. The ship's anti-submarine armament was also gradually increased during the war, with the number of depth charges carried increasing from 15 to as many as 60–90. Other wartime changes included the fitting of radar and High-frequency direction finding gear.

Service
Weston, which was nicknamed "Aggie on Horseback" in service (based on the ship's namesake, Weston-Super-Mare and the Victorian philanthropist Agnes Weston, founder of the Royal Sailors' Rests in Plymouth and Portsmouth), came under command of the Commander-in-Chief, Africa on commissioning, where she served until August 1935, when the sloop joined the East Indies Station, operating in the Red Sea.

The ship started a major refit at Malta in February 1939, and in June that year was moved to Portsmouth Dockyard, where the refit was continued, completing in September 1939. Weston was then assigned to the Rosyth Escort Force, but on 13 September 1939 ran aground in the North Sea on her way to Rosyth, although damage was minor. Duties in the Rosyth Escort Force included escorting convoys along the East coast of Britain. On 14 December 1939, the destroyer  struck a mine off the Tyne. Weston, along with the sloop  and the destroyer , escorted Kelly as she was towed into port.

On 24 February 1940, Weston rescued 27 survivors from the merchant ship , which had been sunk by a mine off the Firth of Forth earlier that day. In May 1939, Westons pennant number changed from L72 to U72. All of U-13s crew were picked up by Weston, while a set of standing orders from Admiral Karl Dönitz prohibiting the rescue of survivors by German U-boats in British waters was also recovered. These orders were used in the prosecution case against Donitz at the Nuremberg trials in 1946. On 1 August 1940, when escorting Convoy FN 239, Weston claimed a German bomber shot down while escorting a convoy.

From January 1941, Weston was part of the Northern Escort Force, and from July 1941, the Londonderry Sloop Division. By 1 October that year, Weston was part of the 42nd Escort Group, still based at Londonderry Port. Weston was refitted at Dundee between June and September 1942.

In late February 1943, Weston formed part of the escort for the tanker convoy UC 1, consisting of 32 ships (mainly empty oil tankers), travelling from Britain to Curaçao in the Caribbean, with a Royal Navy close escort of four sloops and two frigates, supported by a support group of four US Navy destroyers. From 23 February the convoy came under attack by a group of 11 German submarines, with three tankers being sunk and two more damaged, with one U-boat,  being sunk by Totland. Weston was refitted at Belfast between June and August 1943, and was then sent to Freetown to join the West Africa Command, joining Escort Group 55, also based at Freetown, in March 1944. In October 1944, Weston was sent to Bermuda for a refit, and in January 1945, returned to Britain for completion of the refit at Portsmouth. On completion of the refit, Weston was used for escorting coastal convoys until the end of the war in Europe.

In June 1945, Weston was laid up in reserve, and on 22 May 1947, she was transferred to British Iron & Steel Corporation for scrapping.

References

Notes

Citations

Bibliography

Further reading
 
 

Shoreham-class sloops
Sloops of the Royal Navy
Ships built in Plymouth, Devon
1932 ships